The Clemson–Georgia Tech football rivalry is an American college football rivalry between the Clemson Tigers football team of Clemson University and Georgia Tech Yellow Jackets football team of Georgia Tech.  Both schools are members of the Atlantic Coast Conference.  Since conference expansion in 2005, Clemson represents the Atlantic Division while Georgia Tech plays in the Coastal Division, and they are official cross-divisional rivals which play every year.

Clemson won the first four games of the rivalry, but Georgia Tech leads the all-time series 51–32–2. There have been two lengthy win streaks, as the Yellow Jackets went 15–0 against Clemson from 1908 to 1934 and 10–0 against Clemson from 1953 to 1968. Football legend John Heisman coached both teams and went undefeated in the rivalry. Heisman coached (and won) two games for Clemson against Georgia Tech before switching sides and going 12–0–1 for Georgia Tech against Clemson. From 1902 to 1973, all games were played in Atlanta near the campus of Georgia Tech. The home-and-home ACC series has been hotly contested at 21–17 (in favor of Clemson) since it began in 1983. The rivalry was played twice in a single year when Georgia Tech defeated Clemson in September 2009 and repeated the feat when they faced off again in the 2009 ACC Championship Game three months later.

The rivals have seen large and similar amounts of high-level success, as Georgia Tech claims four national championships (1917, 1928, 1954, 1990) and Clemson three (1981, 2016, 2018). Moreover, Georgia Tech (25–19) and Clemson (24–20) have each played in 44 bowl games, while Clemson and Georgia Tech have 744 and 735 all-time wins, respectively, as of the conclusion of the 2018 season.

These two ACC members also coincidentally have more of a science, technology, engineering, and mathematics focus than their sibling flagship university state schools from the SEC — with which they also have intense rivalries: Georgia Tech's Clean, Old-Fashioned Hate rivalry with the Georgia Bulldogs, and Clemson's Palmetto Bowl game against the South Carolina Gamecocks.

Series history

Through 2019, the teams have played 85 times, with Tech leading the series 50–32–2, with 60 games played in Atlanta, and only 20 games played in Clemson's Memorial Stadium. The teams first met in 1898, when Clemson's third-year program defeated Georgia Tech 23–0 to finish with a 3–1 record. The following year, the Tigers beat Tech again, 41–5. In 1904, Georgia Tech lured away Clemson's head coach, John Heisman (namesake of the Heisman Trophy), with the prospect of $450 pay raise ($ adjusted for inflation), which was a 25% salary increase.

In 1977, Georgia Tech, a year before it joined the ACC, decided to end its series with Clemson. George Bennett, a Clemson athletics booster, was determined to preserve the game, as the trip to Atlanta provided a unique experience for the Tigers players and fanbase who had not been to a bowl game since 1959. In what was supposed to be the final game in Atlanta, upon Bennett's suggestion, thousands of Clemson supporters paid their expenses with two-dollar bills stamped with the shape of a tiger paw. This demonstrated the large amount of money that the Clemson fanbase regularly pumped into the local economy because of the game.

The series resumed in 1983 when Georgia Tech began playing football in the ACC. This has become one of the most competitive rivalries in the ACC with a record of 17-16, with Clemson currently leading the series by one game (excluding the vacated 2009 ACC Championship Game won by Tech). These games have often been decided at the last minute and by small margins. Nine of the games between 1996 and 2006 were decided by five points or less.

When the Atlantic Coast Conference- ACC- reorganized in 2005 to form divisions for the sport of football, Clemson and Georgia Tech were designated as cross-division rivals. This means that their football teams meet every season, unlike games between each team's other non-divisional conference opponents, which are played less often on a rotational basis.

In the 2009 season, both teams won their respective division in the ACC. For the first time in the series' history, the two teams met for a second time in a season on December 5, 2009 in the ACC Championship Game. The game marked the first ever December meeting between the two teams, as well as the first post-season meeting. It was also the first time the series has been played outside of Atlanta or Clemson since 1899. Georgia Tech won 39–34; however, the NCAA later vacated the last 3 games of Georgia Tech's 2009 season along with the ACC Championship.  The NCAA determined that starting WR Demaryius Thomas should have been ruled ineligible ahead of the previous game for accepting $312 worth of clothing from a potential agent.  While the offense was minor, and the individual never proven to be an agent and the clothing returned, the NCAA ruled that Georgia Tech's athletic department had prepared the players prior to submitting statements, and was generally uncooperative with the NCAA investigation.  Therefore, all games following the alleged offense have been vacated, including the 2009 ACC championship game with Clemson.

In the 2011 season, both teams started 6–0.  Clemson had beaten previous national champion Auburn earlier in the season, and the match-up was highly anticipated until Georgia Tech stumbled losing two straight games, at Virginia and at Miami (FL).  Clemson's Andre Ellington was injured, and after 4 Clemson turnovers, Georgia Tech went on to upset the #5 Tigers 31-17.  Both teams went on to lose three games toward the end of the season, with the exception of Clemson's dominating performance over Coastal Division champion #5 Virginia Tech to clinch the 2011 ACC Championship.

Game results

See also 
 List of NCAA college football rivalry games

References

External links
Roy Martin, Clemson – Georgia Tech Preview, TigerNet.com, October 28, 2005.
Ga. Tech – Clemson becomes heated rivalry, The State, p. C1, September 13, 2002.
Scott Michaux, Tigers win the big matchup, but little decided, The Augusta Chronicle, October 22, 2006.

College football rivalries in the United States
Clemson Tigers football
Georgia Tech Yellow Jackets football